The Houtman Abrolhos, an island chain off the coast of Western Australia, is one of the most important areas in the world for breeding colonies of seabirds. Around 90 species of seabird occur there, as well as three species of shore bird, and six species of land bird.

References

Houtman Abrolhos
Lists of fauna of the Houtman Abrolhos